Janette Picton (born 1963), is a female former athlete who competed for England.

Athletics career
Picton was twice a National champion after winning the 1982 and 1989 AAA National Championships in the discus.

She represented England in the discus, at the 1982 Commonwealth Games in Brisbane, Queensland, Australia. Eight years later she represented England in the discus event, at the 1990 Commonwealth Games in Auckland, New Zealand. After she retired from the discus event she took up marathon running in 1993 and finished in 32nd place during the 1994 London Marathon.

References

1963 births
English female discus throwers
Athletes (track and field) at the 1982 Commonwealth Games
Athletes (track and field) at the 1990 Commonwealth Games
Living people
Commonwealth Games competitors for England